Mack's Apples (also known as Moose Hill Orchards) is a farm and orchard in Londonderry, New Hampshire, United States. It is the oldest family-run farm in the state, having been run by the Mack family for eight generations.

History

The farm was founded in 1732 when John Mack emigrated from Londonderry, Ireland, to Londonderry, New Hampshire. In the 1800s, the family began to concentrate on growing apples, and the farm was formally registered as a business in 1962. The farm eliminated its wholesale operations in the early 2000s. In 2015, Andy Mack Sr. transferred ownership to his son, Andy Mack Jr., and his daughter-in-law, Carol Mack. In 2021, the farm was sold to MHO Acquisitions LLC who intend to continue operating the orchard.

Operations
The farm store sells numerous varieties of apples, as well as peaches, pumpkins, squash, maple syrup, and honey. The farm also runs a pick-your-own apples offering and an ice cream stand.

The town of Londonderry has purchased conservation easements to help preserve the farm as green space.

The farm is a frequent stop for liberal politicians visiting Londonderry, including Barack Obama on three occasions. Andy Mack Sr. often places signs on the property supporting progressive issues.

Gallery

References

Companies established in 1732
Companies based in Rockingham County, New Hampshire
Londonderry, New Hampshire
Farms in New Hampshire
1732 establishments in New Hampshire
Food and drink companies established in 1732
Orchards